Bray-sur-Seine (literally Bray on Seine) is a commune in the Seine-et-Marne department in the Île-de-France region in north-central France.

Demographics
The inhabitants are called Braytois.

Natives
 Nicholas of Bray (fl. 1226), French Latin poet, author of the epic Gesta Ludovici VIII
 Eugène Penancier, French politician, Minister of Justice and Deputy Prime Minister of France

See also
 Communes of the Seine-et-Marne department

References

External links

 1999 Land Use, from IAURIF (Institute for Urban Planning and Development of the Paris-Île-de-France région) 
 

Communes of Seine-et-Marne
Champagne (province)